Qumi-Qumi (Kumi-Kumi) is a Russian animated series created by Toonbox best known for the Cut the Rope cartoons. From November 2012, it premiered on TV Multimedia and Carousel. On October 14, 2013, it began broadcasting on the channel STS. The series was developed with the financial support of the Government of Moscow, and since 2011 with the support of Film Foundation. It is based around a small comic book from 2005 that eventually made it into a small music video in 2007, and eventually into a full-fledged cartoon in 2011, Qumi-Qumi tells of three different tribes: the magic-based tribal Jumi-Qumi, the science-based capitalist Yumi-Qumi, and the militaristic and communistic Shumi-Qumi. Three young outcasts of each tribe, Juga, Yusi, and Shumadan, manage to break out of their social norms and become close friends. The speech of the characters is a gibberish language known as Tarabar (though with its own specific words) peppered with Russian phrases. Many plots relate around Juga and Shumadan's crushes on Yusi and trying to interact with their respective tribes despite their own faults.

Plot summary

Qumi-Qumi is a comedy animated series for kids ages 8–12. The prototypes of Qumi-Qumi were created in 2005 for a comic strip festival. In 2008, a short cartoon music video with dancing Qumi-Qumi characters in it gained high popularity online with 5 million viewings.

Synopsis
The amazing world of Qumi-Qumi in which the show is set bears a remote resemblance to Earth, however, its flora and fauna hold far more fanciful traits. The Qumi world consists of three tribes which live separately: those are the Yumi-Qumi (technology-focused people modeled on modern America), Jumi-Qumi (shamanistic and rustic, roughly based on tribal African societies) and Shumi-Qumi (militaristic and resembling Soviet Russia). Juga, Yusi and Shumadan come from different tribes but get on much better with each other than with their co-tribesmen (who consider them weirdos). In every episode one of the three friends runs into trouble all of them need to clear it up. The fact that both Juga and Shumadan are in love with Yusi doesn't make the situation any easier.
The series lacks dialogue, the characters speak the simple constructed Qumi language with words mostly based on words from Toki Pona, English, Japanese, Korean, and Russian, as well as some words and phrases from popular culture. Dynamic plots, crazy adventures and beautiful animation make up for the terseness of the series.

The series is set in an abstract reality. Qumi-Qumi world bears a slight resemblance to Earth reality; however it is notable for fanciful and colorful landscapes and fantastical creatures living in them. Some of the characters may be based on other media.

Background
The show originates in 2005, when creator Vladimir Ponomarev created a comic of the show for the comics festival. Eventually, in 2008, a small music video was made out of this comic, which was a hit success. Finally, after a pilot in 2010, the show was finally released in 2011. Each episode is 11-minutes long.

Characters

Main

Juga

Juga (Russian: Джуга) is a Jumi-Qumi member voiced by Vladimir Ponomarev. He is lazy and somewhat rude, which causes him to lose focus on his magic very easily. Like Shumadan, he has a crush on Yusi, and competes with him to try and win her heart. He often uses dirty tricks to succeed through life, but he is good at heart, and will still help his friends when they truly need it. Like the other members of his tribe, Juga is blue and rectangular with three ear-like extensions in various shades of blue coming out of the back of his head. He often wears a red, black, green, and orange skullcap. He has black legs, and blue arms with black fingers. A small thing is located in between his legs or possibly on his back - it might be a small tail of sorts.

Yusi

Yusi (Russian: Юси) is one of the main characters on Qumi-Qumi. She is a Yumi-Qumi who is voiced by Maryana Spivak in the first, second and fourteenth episode and Alina Rin in the rest of the series. Yusi is a representative of the Yumi-Qumi tribe. She is a hippie-girl coming from a wealthy family who is bored with chasing success. However, Yusi is used to comfort and sometimes acts as a spoiled and fickle girl. Yusi loves high-tech gadgets and is always carrying her portable device which can transform into anything from a phone to a scooter. Yusi can fix any complicated gadget in no time. She is very cheerful and never feels depressed. Yusi is sensitive and sentimental. She loves animals; however, there's almost none left on her island. Being sober-minded, Yusi counterbalances energetic Juga and phlegmatic Shumadan. She cannot understand which of the guys she loves more and behaves as a coquette nourishing their rivalry.

Shumadan

Shumadan (Russian: Шумадан) is a Shumi-Qumi member voiced by Vladimir Ponomarev. Like the rest of the Shumi-Qumi, Shumadan is rectangular and green. He has three striped ear-like extensions coming out of his head in green, orange, and black. He has black eyes with three eyelashes on each eye. His mouth is burnt orange, and he has green arms striped orange and lime. His legs are striped in two shades of green. He wears a bag with two red and blue military badges on the straps.

Recurring

Bai-Baba
Bai-Baba (Russian: Бай-Баба) is a recurring character. She is a Jumi-Qumi, and is voiced by Maryana Spivak. Bai-Baba is the second-most important member of the Jumi-Qumi tribe, after the Chief. She is the tribe's witch doctor and medicine woman. It is also her job to teach the young Jumi-Qumi magic skills. She is easily frustrated by Juga, as he is one of her constantly-failing students. She is one of the saner members of the tribe, but resorts to crazy measures in desperate times. She also owns a ceremonial mask that looks like a gas mask that she often wears in certain situations.

Shumi-Qumi General
Shumi-Qumi General (Russian: Генерал Шуми-Куми) is leader of the Shumi-Qumi tribe and a recurring character in the show. Voiced by Alexander Vlasov

Oilo
Oilo (Russian: Ойло) Is a small oil creature that the Shumi-Qumi General wanted to use to make oil rockets. Voiced by Alina Rin

Elvis
Elvis (Russian: Элвис) known as "The King of Rock and Roll" is the only real world character that appears in the show. Voiced by Mark Thompson

Ququlka
Ququlka (Russian: Кукулька) is a small cyclonic creature who is often seen in the show. Voiced by Alina Rin

Episodes

1st (2012)
 The Legend (Russian: Легенда)
 Money, Money (Russian: Мани, Мани)
 Solar Energy (Russian: Солнечная Энергия)
 Trash Toad (Russian: Мусорная жаба)
 Fishing (Russian: Рыбалка)
 The Cloudies (Russian: Облачный край)
 Snowman (Russian: Новый Год)
 Oilo (Russian: Ойло)
 The Small Worm (Russian: Червячок)
 The Third Eye (Russian: Третий глаз)
 The Robot (Russian: Робот)
 General In Love (Russian: Влюбленный генерал)
 The Zombie (Russian: Зомби)
 The Portals (Russian: Порталы)

2nd in 3D (2017)
 (16A) Hocus-Pocus - Stories 1 (360)
 (16B) Hocus-Pocus - Stories 2 (360)
 (16C) Hocus-Pocus - Stories 3 (360)

3rd in 3D (2019)
 (17) A Lost Dream
 (18) The Time Machine
 (19) Just But
 (20) Jumpscare

4th in 2D (2020)
 (21) Love Ballad
 (22) Love Ballad 2

Awards

 2012 — Qumi-Qumi was awarded as People's Choice at the 17th International Festival of Children's Animation "The Goldfish";
 2012 — the most wicked and mean character was found in Qumi-Qumi series by the jury of the first Festival of National Animation;
 2013 — episode "The Third Eye" was awarded as the best animated movie of the year by Newgrounds.
 2014 — episode "The Zombie" was awarded as the best visual imagery by the kids' jury;
 2019 — Qumi-Qumi in an updated format (2D+3D) was awarded as the best series at XXIV Suzdal Animation Fest.

External links
 Official website

2011 Russian television series debuts
2010s Russian television series
2010s animated television series
Russian children's animated comedy television series
STS (TV channel) original programming
Carousel (TV channel) original programming
Animated television series without speech